Bill Bradford Clark (born June 28, 1968) is a retired American football coach. He was the head football coach at the University of Alabama at Birmingham (UAB). He held the position from 2014 season until June 24, 2022, when he retired because of health issues dealing with his back.

Career

Clark was born in Anniston, Alabama and grew up in Piedmont, Alabama, where he graduated from Piedmont High School. A pivotal moment in his life occurred during a summer workout between his freshman and sophomore years. He suffered a back injury while attempting to squat an excessive amount of weight. The injury worsened as he continued to play through it. After the pain reached an intolerable level, he consulted local orthopedic surgeon James Andrews, who would later become famous for treating athletes such as Michael Jordan and Brett Favre. Andrews told Clark that his spine was too seriously injured for him to play football, and that surgery (which was less advanced in the mid-1980s than today) was risky.

Clark started his coaching career as an offensive line coach at his alma mater of Piedmont High immediately out of college. From there, he moved to assistant posts at several other high schools until getting his first head coaching job at Prattville High School in Prattville, Alabama. During his tenure at Prattville, Clark compiled an overall record of 106 wins to only 11 losses (106–11) and won back-to-back Alabama High School Athletic Association (AHSAA) state championships in 2006 and 2007. In 2008, Clark was hired to serve as the first defensive coordinator at South Alabama. He stayed in that role through the 2012 season when he was hired as head coach at Jacksonville State. During his only season as head coach at Jacksonville State, Clark led the Gamecocks to their first playoff victories, 49 school records, 13 OVC records and three NCAA records. In January 2014, Clark was hired to serve as the fifth head coach at UAB following the resignation of Garrick McGee.

On December 2, 2014, UAB president Ray L. Watts announced that, after commissioning an in-depth inspection of UAB's athletic budget and revenue and how the elimination of football from the athletic program would affect those, UAB had decided to close down the football program in order to save money. On June 1, 2015 news reported that the UAB Blazers football program would be reinstated. That September, Clark and UAB agreed to a five-year contract extension.

However, Clark was left with a bare-bones staff with virtually no players, since the team would not resume play until 2017. According to a 2022 story by ESPN journalist Alex Scarborough,

The Blazers would go on to win the Conference USA (C-USA) West Division in each of the next three seasons, including wins in the 2018 and 2020 C-USA championship games. Clark's final game as Blazers head coach was a win over nationally ranked BYU in the 2021 Independence Bowl, the end of a season that also saw the Blazers open the new Protective Stadium and announce a 2023 move to the American Athletic Conference.

After seven years coaching at UAB, Clark resigned in June 24, 2022 citing back problems. He underwent successful spinal fusion surgery shortly after his retirement.

Head coaching record

College

Notes

References

External links
 UAB profile

1968 births
Living people
Jacksonville State Gamecocks football coaches
Jacksonville State University alumni
South Alabama Jaguars football coaches
Coaches of American football from Alabama
UAB Blazers football coaches
High school football coaches in Alabama
Sportspeople from Anniston, Alabama